The War of the Worlds is a 1980 board wargame published by Task Force Games.

Gameplay
The War of the Worlds is a game in which humans defend Victorian London from Martian invaders.

Video game
Task Force Games developed a 16K computer version of The War of the Worlds. It was published in 1983.

Reception
Tony Watson reviewed The War of the Worlds in The Space Gamer No. 35. Watson commented that "TWotW does a good job of taking an interesting but very unbalanced situation and making it into a fun game."

Eric Goldberg reviewed War of the Worlds in Ares Magazine #9 and commented that "If the players can accept the radical revisions to the plot of the novel, they have a game which should prove tense for the first five or so plays.  After that, War of the Worlds is a solved puzzle."

References

Board games introduced in 1980
Task Force Games games
Works based on The War of the Worlds